The Sun Odyssey 42.1 is a French sailboat that was designed by Daniel Andrieu as cruiser and first built in 1992.

The Sun Odyssey 42.1 replaced the unrelated 1990 Sun Odyssey 42 design in production. It was followed by a series of other designs which all had similar names and intended markets, including the 1995 Sun Odyssey 42.2, the 1996 Sun Odyssey 42 CC, the 2005 Sun Odyssey 42i and the 2007 Sun Odyssey 42 DS.

Production
The design was built by Jeanneau in France, from 1992 until 1995, but it is now out of production.

Design
The Sun Odyssey 42.1 is a recreational keelboat, built predominantly of fiberglass, with wood trim. It has a masthead sloop rig, a raked stem, a reverse transom, an internally mounted spade-type rudder controlled by a wheel and a fixed fin keel or optional shoal-draft keel. It displaces  and carries  of ballast.

The design has sleeping accommodation for six people, with a double "V"-berth in the bow cabin, a "U"-shaped settee and a straight settee in the main cabin and two aft cabins, each with a double berth. The galley is located on the port side, amidships. The galley is an open "U" shape and is equipped with a two-burner stove, an ice box and a double sink. A navigation station is beside the companionway ladder, on the starboard side. There are two heads, one just aft of the bow cabin on the starboard side and one on the port side, aft.

Operational history
The boat is supported by an active class club, the Jeanneau Owners Network.

See also
List of sailing boat types

References

External links

Keelboats
1990s sailboat type designs
Sailing yachts
Sailboat type designs by Daniel Andrieu
Sailboat types built by Jeanneau